William Walter Douglas Howle (born 9 November 1989) is a British actor. His films include On Chesil Beach, The Seagull, and Outlaw King. On television, he is known for his roles in the E4 drama Glue, the BBC miniseries The Serpent, MotherFatherSon, and the BritBox thriller series The Beast Must Die.

Early life
Howle was born in Stoke-on-Trent, Staffordshire. His mother was a school teacher and his father was a music professor and composer. He was born the second of four boys, with three brothers, Sam (older), George and Alfie (younger).

Due to his father's profession the family moved 12 times when Howle was a child, before settling in Scarborough. It was there that he became involved in the local music scene. At 18, he left home to study drama at the Bristol Old Vic Theatre School, before embarking on his career.

Career
Howle made his debut as James Warwick on the E4 television series Glue. He co-starred in the 2017 film The Sense of an Ending (as the younger version of Jim Broadbent's lead character) and the miniseries The Witness for the Prosecution in the pivotal role of the defendant in a murder case, Leonard Vole.

Howle appeared in the war film Dunkirk, and starred alongside Saoirse Ronan in the film, On Chesil Beach, an adaptation of Ian McEwan's novel. He appears in the film adaptation of Anton Chekhov's The Seagull and in the Netflix film Outlaw King.

Howle was the face of Prada S/S16, shot by Craig McDean.

In 2019, Howle starred alongside Richard Gere and Helen McCrory in the BBC Drama series MotherFatherSon, which was written by Tom Rob Smith and he and Jodie Comer made cameo for Star Wars: The Rise of Skywalker

In 2021 he starred in the BBC series The Serpent as Herman Knippenberg, and on BritBox's The Beast Must Die as Nigel.

In February 2022, Howle starred in Chloe as Elliott, appearing in all six episodes. He also appeared in Under the Banner of Heaven.  In the latter part of 2022, Howle played the title role in John Haidar’s production of Shakespeare’s Hamlet. It was performed at the Bristol Old Vic.

Howle will play a 1970s' boxer in Kid Snow.

Filmography

Film

Television

Stage
The Little Mermaid (2014)
Ghosts (2015)
Long Day's Journey Into Night (2016)
Europe (2018)
Hamlet, Bristol Old Vic (2022)

References

External links
 

1989 births
Living people
People from Stoke-on-Trent
British male film actors
British male television actors
21st-century British male actors
Actors from Staffordshire
Male actors from Yorkshire
Actors from Scarborough, North Yorkshire
Alumni of Bristol Old Vic Theatre School